David John Marlais Daniel (12 January 1903 – 5 February 1962) was a member of the Queensland Legislative Assembly.

Biography
Daniel was born at Rockhampton, Queensland, the son of Owen Daniel and his wife Sarah Ann (née Jenkins). He was educated at Rockhampton State School and then attended the Rockhampton Grammar School before owning a tobacco shop in that city.
 
On the 19 January 1927 he married Julia Augusta Nelson and together had two sons. He died at his home in Rockhampton in February 1962.

Public career
Daniel, a Country Party representative, won the 1936 by-election for the seat of Keppel in the Queensland Legislative Assembly, taking it over from his father, Owen Daniel, who had died in February of that year. David Daniel went on to represent the electorate until his retirement at the 1944 Queensland state election.

In 1941 he was given leave by the parliament to join the Second Australian Imperial Force during World War II, being discharged in 1944 at the rank of Major.

References

Members of the Queensland Legislative Assembly
1903 births
1962 deaths
National Party of Australia members of the Parliament of Queensland
20th-century Australian politicians
Australian Army personnel of World War II
Australian Army officers